Zoran Danoski (born 20 October 1990) is a Macedonian winger who plays for Serbian club Mladost Lučani.

Club career 
He started his career in Kožuf. In 2009 he signed for the Czech football club Banik Most, where he spent the next three seasons. After that, he moved to Pribram and conducts the next 3 seasons, from which in the winter of 2015 he will be forwarded to the loan to Banik.

In 2015 he moves to Macedonia and moves to Metalurg from Skopje. On 4 July 2016 he moved to 1.HNL in Inter from Zapresic where he played only five matches. In 2017 he moves again to Pribram, but only after half a season he returns to Macedonia and signs for a club from his hometown Pobeda.

After a half-season in Pobeda, in the summer of 2018, he signed a two-year contract with a Radnik Surdulica. His official debut for Radnik in 12 fixture match of the 2018–19 Serbian SuperLiga season against Napredak, played on 20 October 2018. He was named the best player of the 21 rounds of SuperLiga in the win against OFK Bačka in Surdulica, he scored the goal and assisted 2 times.

On 22 September 2021, he signed with Mladost Lučani.

References

External links
 

1990 births
Living people
Sportspeople from Prilep
Association football midfielders
Macedonian footballers
FK Baník Most players
1. FK Příbram players
FK Metalurg Skopje players
NK Inter Zaprešić players
FK Pobeda players
FK Radnik Surdulica players
FK Proleter Novi Sad players
FK Mladost Lučani players
Czech First League players
Macedonian First Football League players
Croatian Football League players
Serbian SuperLiga players
Macedonian expatriate footballers
Expatriate footballers in the Czech Republic
Macedonian expatriate sportspeople in the Czech Republic
Expatriate footballers in Croatia
Macedonian expatriate sportspeople in Croatia
Expatriate footballers in Serbia
Macedonian expatriate sportspeople in Serbia